Edward Robert King-Harman (3 April 1838 – 10 June 1888) was an Irish landlord and politician. He sat in the House of Commons of the United Kingdom between 1877 and 1888 as an Irish nationalist, and later Unionist, Member of Parliament.

Early life
King-Harman was the son of Lawrence Harman King-Harman and his wife Cecilia Johnstone of Stirling. His father was the younger son of Robert King, 1st Viscount Lorton and inherited from him the estates of Rockingham, County Roscommon, and Newcastle, Ballymahon, County Longford. King-Harman was educated at Eton and became a lieutenant in the 60th Rifles and captain in the Longford Militia. He inherited Rockingham which was a fine house built by John Nash, but altered in a less than sympathetic way in the late 19th century in order to provide more accommodation. He was J.P. for the counties of Sligo, Longford and Westmeath and Honorary Colonel of the 5th Battalion, Connaught Rangers. He published in the Freeman's Journal and was a member of the Arts Club from 1863 until his death.

Political career
King-Harman stood unsuccessfully as Isaac Butt's Nationalist Home Rule candidate in the May 1870 rerun of the December 1869 Longford by-election after the result of the first vote was overturned. In January 1877, he was elected Member of Parliament for Sligo County but lost the seat at the 1880 general election. He then became Lord Lieutenant and Custos Rotulorum of Roscommon in 1878. In 1883 he was elected MP for Dublin County, until the seat was divided under the Redistribution of Seats Act 1885.  He was initially a Nationalist Home Ruler but subsequently became a Unionist. As result of Gladstone's Representation of the People Act 1884 which would extend the Irish franchise, some Orangemen were threatening violence and T. P. O'Connor complained in parliament of several politicians using inflammatory language. O'Connor quoted as an example King-Harman's advice to "Keep the cartridge in the rifle."

In 1885 King-Harman was elected as a Unionist (Conservative) MP for the English seat of Isle of Thanet. In 1887 he was a parliamentary Under-Secretary for Ireland. He held the seat until his  death from heart disease at Rockingham in Boyle, Ireland at the age of 49 in 1888.

Family
King-Harman married, in 1864, Emma Frances Worsley, daughter of Sir William Worsley, 1st Baronet.  They had one daughter, Frances Agnes, who married Sir Thomas Stafford, 1st Baronet, a physician and member of the Irish Privy Council.  They in turn had two sons, the younger of whom, Cecil Stafford-King-Harman, inherited the baronetcy and the Rockingham estates.

References

External links 
 

1838 births
1888 deaths
People educated at Eton College
King's Royal Rifle Corps officers
Lord-Lieutenants of Roscommon
Members of the Parliament of the United Kingdom for County Sligo constituencies (1801–1922)
Members of the Parliament of the United Kingdom for County Dublin constituencies (1801–1922)
UK MPs 1874–1880
UK MPs 1880–1885
UK MPs 1885–1886
UK MPs 1886–1892
Members of the Parliament of the United Kingdom for English constituencies
Members of the Privy Council of Ireland
Edward
Artists' Rifles soldiers
Irish landlords
19th-century Irish landowners